The Munson-Williams-Proctor Arts Institute (MWPAI) is a regional fine arts center founded in 1919 and located in Utica, New York. The institute has three program divisions, museum of art, performing arts and school of art.

Museum of art
The museum of art has a substantial permanent collection of internationally recognized works.  They are exhibited in the Munson-Williams-Proctor Arts Institute Museum of Art Building.  It is an International-style building designed by architect Philip Johnson and completed in 1960. A model of the building was exhibited in the United States Pavilion at the Brussels' World's Fair of 1958. It is a 60,000 sqft square and supported by eight external ferro-concrete piers, or two on each side.  The exterior structural members are clad in bronze and "black" Canadian granite. The windowless cube is set above windowed office areas recessed in a dry moat, giving a "floating" effect.  The interior features a two-story central courtyard, illuminated by a skylight, known as the Edward Wales Root Sculpture Court.  It also holds an auditorium seating 271. It was listed on the National Register of Historic Places in 2010.

Next-door is a Victorian-era Italianate mansion called Fountain Elms,  listed on the National Register of Historic Places in 1972.  It houses the MWPAI decorative arts collection. It is connected to the Museum of Art building by an education wing built in 1995.

The museum has an extensive collection of European and American art. A highlight of the permanent collection is the first of the two original sets of Thomas Cole's famous series of paintings titled The Voyage of Life: The second set is at the National Gallery Washington, DC.

School of art
The art school was begun 1936, when The Arts Guild of New York City moved its school to a remodeled garage on the ground of the Institute and, under the name of the School of Related Arts and Sciences, began to offer courses in visual arts, the history and philosophy of art, and comparative symbolism.

In 1999, MWPAI became a satellite campus of the Pratt Institute. A program called Pratt at Munson-Williams-Proctor or PrattMWP allows students to study for two years in Utica, New York, called a "Foundations Program", before completing their Bachelor of Fine Arts degree at Pratt Institute's main campus in Brooklyn, New York. PrattMWP is accredited by the National Association of Schools of Art and Design, Middle States Association, and New York State Education Department.

References

External links

Munson-Williams-Proctor Arts Institute
PrattMWP

Museums on the National Register of Historic Places in New York (state)
School buildings completed in 1960
Buildings and structures in Utica, New York
Arts organizations established in 1919
Museums in Oneida County, New York
Art museums and galleries in New York (state)
University museums in New York (state)
Philip Johnson buildings
Arts centers in New York (state)
Museums of American art
1919 establishments in New York (state)
University art museums and galleries in New York (state)
National Register of Historic Places in Oneida County, New York